Dalton is a railway station on the Furness Line, which runs between  and . It is owned by Network Rail and managed by Northern Trains.

History
Construction of the Furness Railway was authorised in May 1844. A line between Dalton and Kirkby was opened on 12 August 1846, when the earlier sections were officially opened. Dalton station was opened to passengers on 24 August 1846.

The station once had three platforms; however, only two are in use today. The disused one is adjacent to the Barrow-bound platform, from which it is separated by a wooden fence. The area is now very overgrown and inaccessible to the public.

Facilities
The station is unstaffed, with a card-only ticket machine on the southbound side; passengers have to obtain a promise-to-pay notice to pay by cash on board the train. Digital signs and timetable posters are provided on each platform for train running information purposes. The station buildings are no longer in rail use, though shelters are located on each side. Access to the platforms is either via steps from the over bridge at the south end or via paths from adjacent public roads (the latter are step-free).

Services

On Sundays, there is also an hourly service each way, with a few through trains and from Carlisle since the summer 2018 timetable change

Freight diversionary line
Freight trains for the Cumbrian Coast line (most notably nuclear reprocessing traffic) leave the line about a kilometre west of Dalton and take the direct line northwards to Askam. This route (the original 1846 line from Kirkby-in-Furness to Dalton) avoids having to go through Barrow station.

References

External links

 
 

Railway stations in Cumbria
DfT Category F2 stations
Former Furness Railway stations
Railway stations in Great Britain opened in 1846
Northern franchise railway stations
1846 establishments in England
Dalton-in-Furness